Milan Area Schools is a school district headquartered in Milan, Michigan.

The district is part of the Washtenaw Intermediate School District but most of its 89 square miles are located in neighbouring Monroe County.  The Milan Area Schools District serves all of the City of Milan; most of neighbouring York Charter Township and Milan Township, in Washtenaw and Monroe counties, respectively; most of nearby London Township and a portion of Exeter Township, both in Monroe County; and small portions of nearby Saline Township, Pittsfield Charter Township, and Augusta Charter Township, all in Washtenaw County.

The Washtenaw County portion of the district is bounded to the north by the Ann Arbor Public Schools; by the Saline Area Schools to the northwest; the Ypsilanti Community Schools to the northeast; and the Lincoln Consolidated Schools are to the east of the Washtenaw portion of the Milan Area Schools while due north of the Monroe County portion of the district.  The remainder of the district in Monroe County is bounded by the Airport Community Schools to the east, the Dundee Community Schools to the south, both in Monroe County; and by the Britton-Macon Area Schools to the west, across the line in Lenawee County.

Schools

Secondary schools
 Milan High School
 Milan Middle School
Primary schools
 Paddock Elementary School
 Clayton H. Symons Elementary School

They have recently renovated all of the schools except for the relatively new high school.

References

External links

 Milan Area Schools

Education in Washtenaw County, Michigan
School districts in Michigan
Education in Monroe County, Michigan